Edward Raper (1806 – 29 March 1882) was an Irish-born Australian politician.

He was born in Dublin and migrated to Australia around 1832. In 1834 he married Jane Feeney, with whom he had seven children. He worked as a butcher in Sydney, and in 1860 was elected to the New South Wales Legislative Assembly for Canterbury. He was defeated in 1864. Raper died at Darlinghurst in 1882.

References

 

1806 births
1882 deaths
Members of the New South Wales Legislative Assembly
19th-century Australian politicians